de Montesinos may refer to:

 Luis de Montesinos,  a Spanish theologian.
 Antonio de Montesinos (Dominican friar), who in 1511 was the first member of the clergy to publicly speak about the human rights of the indigenous peoples of the Americas.
 Antonio de Montezinos, who in 1644 claimed to have found one of the Ten Lost Tribes of Israel living in the Ecuadorean jungles.